Hellaro is a 2019 Indian Gujarati period drama film co-written and directed by Abhishek Shah and produced by Ashish Patel, Nirav Patel, Aayush Patel, Prateek Gupta, Mit Jani and Abhishek Shah under the banner of Saarthi Productions and Harfanmaula films. The film features an ensemble cast of Jayesh More, Shraddha Dangar, Brinda Trivedi Nayak, Shachi Joshi, Niilam Paanchal, Tejal Panchasara and Kausambi Bhatt and marks the directorial debut of Abhishek Shah. The film revolves around a group of women living in the Rann of Kutch in the 1970s.

Hellaro won the National Film Award for Best Feature Film at the 66th National Film Awards. It was officially selected as the opening film at Indian Panorama, at 50th International Film Festival of India (IFFI). It was also nominated for the best debut feature film of a director at the film festival. The film was released in theatres in India on 8 November 2019 to positive reviews.

Synopsis
In 1975, a young girl named Manjhri is married off to a small village in the middle of nowhere in the Rann of Kutch. There is no rain in the village since many years. The villagers believe it is a curse of the goddess because of a widow rup who was an embroider and tried to earn money and escaped with another villager. As an apology the men present a Gujarati folkdance garba to impress the goddess, but the women are not allowed to play garba. Every morning the women of the village go to a distant lake to fetch water, this is the only time when they are not suppressed but free. One day they come across an unconscious drummer and help him. In return, he plays his dhol and the women play garba for the first time. Since then, every day they fetch water and play garba. After some time the women convince him to ask the mukhya of their village for shelter and play dhol for navrati. Every day he plays garba for the women at the day and for the men at night. One day the women are caught playing garba and are beaten as a punishment. On the same night the women play garba in the village and it rains.

Cast

 Shraddha Dangar as Manjhri
 Jayesh More as Mulji, a drummer
 Tejal Panchasara as Gomti
 Shailesh Prajapati as Mukhi
 Maulik Nayak as Bhaglo
 Aarjav Trivedi as Arjan
 Brinda Trivedi as Kesar
 Tarjani Bhadla as Gauri
 Niilam Paanchal as Leela
 Kaushambi Bhatt as Champa
 Swati Dave
 Denisha Ghumra as Radha
 Aakash Zala as Joraavar
 Rajan Thakar
 Kishan Gadhvi
 Kamlesh Parmar
 Sachi Joshi
 Riddhi Yadav as Kanchan
 Jagruti Thakore
 Dhriti Patel as Reva
 Kamini Panchal
 Ekta Bachwani
 Parva Bhatt

Production
The debut director and co-writer Abhishek Shah stated that the story was inspired from folklore of the Vrajvani village in Kutch and real-life instances of patriarchy. Prateek Gupta co-wrote screenplay, edited, and co-produced the film while also serving as the Associate Director. Playwright and poet Saumya Joshi wrote lyrics, additional screenplay, and dialogues. Mehul Surti composed the music. Ashish Patel, Nirav Patel, Aayush Patel, Abhishek Shah, Mit Jani, and  Prateek Gupta produced the film under the banner of Saarthi Productions and Harfanmaula films. Aayush Patel and Mit Jani helmed as creative and executive producers.

A set of village with fifteen Bhunga (traditional houses), a town square and a temple was created in Rann of Kutch near Kuran village where the film was shot.

Soundtrack

Release
It was released in theatres on 8 November 2019. The film was released on video on demand service, MX Player on 4 April 2020.

Reception

Critical response 
The film was universally acclaimed by the critics. Abhimanyu Joshi of The Times of India rated it 4 out of 5. He praised the film's direction, story, screenplay, acting, cinematography, music, and choreography, further stating that the film justly deserves the National Award it received and fulfills expectations. Namrata Joshi writing for The Hindu praised the story, direction, production, and cinematography. She further added that the film "questions patriarchy while celebrating the colours and culture of Gujarat". Jigar Ganatra of Mumbai Live called it "masterpiece" and rated 4.5 out of 5. Parsi Times rated it 3.5 out of 5. Delnaz Divecha writing for BookMyShow noted that the film's presentation of the subjects of patriarchy, casteism, and superstition connects the audience, and further praised the film's performances and choreography. She also pointed that "some customs may seem outdated but still happen to be the reality of many rural women". Jinal Bhatt of Mashable India rated it 4.5 out of 5.

Ramesh Tanna of Kutchmitra praised the film for its direction, acting, and cinematography, calling it a "must-watch" but criticised the false subject of opposition to garba and embroidery work, some characterisations, and the lack of Kutchi language in a film set in Kutch. He also questioned the relevance of the film's subject in contemporary times and pointed to the inaccurate representation of Kutch's local culture and the 1970s.

Box office 
The film had grossed over $1,41,304 in overseas market.

Controversy
A police complaint under Atrocities Act was filed against the film's producer, director, and writer for use of term Harijan in the film's dialogue. According to the complaint Jamnaben Vegda, the term is considered derogatory by the Scheduled Caste people.

Accolades

Hellaro was selected as the opening film at the Indian Panorama during the 50th International Film Festival of India (IFFI), held in November 2019 in Goa, where it won a special mention from jury for its "incredible music, colour and choreography." It is also nominated for the best debut feature film of a director at the film festival. It was also screened at the 19th River-to-River Florence Indian Film Festival held in Italy in December 2019. Apart from this Hellaro premiered at numerous Film Festivals like Dhaka International Film Festive 2020, International Film Festival of Bhuvneshwar 2020, and Aurangabad International Film Festival 2020.

Hellaro won the National Film Award for Best Feature Film at the 66th National Film Awards. The thirteen female actresses also won the Special Jury Award  for their performances. It was the first Gujarati film to win the National Film Award for Best Feature Film.

References

External links
 

2019 films
Films set in Gujarat
Films shot in Gujarat
Best Feature Film National Film Award winners
Special Jury Award (feature film) National Film Award winners
Indian historical films
2019 directorial debut films
2010s Gujarati-language films
2019 drama films